Julie Philipault (Paris, 9 May 1780 - Paris, 7 January 1862) was a French painter.

Biography
Marie-Julie-Victoire Chipault, known as Philpaut. (or Phlipault, Philipault), was born on 9 May 1780 in Paris, in the Saint-Gervais quarter of the 4th arrondissement She was the daughter of Louis-Chrisostome Chipault, and his wife, Marie-Élisabeth-Victoire Deschamps de Vallièrre. 

Student of Louise Hersent, she won medals at the Salons of 1814 and 1817. She is one of only twenty-one women artists to have works in the collections of the Louvre.

She died in the 10th arrondissement of Paris on 23 November 1834.

Selected Works
 Racine reading Athalie in front of Louis XIV and Madame de Maintenon (1819), oil on canvas, Louvre, Paris.
 Young Shepherdess admiring Herself in the Water (1821), oil on canvas, Louvre, Paris (currently on loan to Castelnaudary Town Hall).
 Portrait de Marie-Sylphide Calès, née Chardou (1800-10), oil on canvas, musée des Beaux-Arts d'Orléans, Orléans.
 Portrait of the Painter Jean Henry Marlet, oil on canvas, Musée Cantini, Marseille.

References

External Links 
 .

1780 births
1834 deaths
19th-century French painters
French women painters
Painters from Paris
19th-century French women artists